Alexis Zapata (born 10 May 1995) is a Colombian professional footballer who plays as a midfielder for C.S. Emelec.

Club career
After scoring three goals with Colombian club Envigado in the 2014 Torneo di Viareggio, Udinese recruited him.
On 31 January 2014, Zapata completed his loan move to Sassuolo until the end of the season.

References

External links 

1995 births
Living people
Colombian footballers
Footballers from Medellín
Association football wingers
Colombia under-20 international footballers
2015 South American Youth Football Championship players
Envigado F.C. players
Udinese Calcio players
U.S. Sassuolo Calcio players
A.C. Perugia Calcio players
Millonarios F.C. players
C.S. Emelec footballers
Categoría Primera A players
Serie A players
Serie B players
Ecuadorian Serie A players
Colombian expatriate footballers
Colombian expatriate sportspeople in Italy
Expatriate footballers in Italy
Colombian expatriate sportspeople in Ecuador
Expatriate footballers in Ecuador